DHL Aero Expreso S.A. is a cargo airline based out of Panama City, Panama. It is wholly owned by Deutsche Post and operates the group's DHL-branded parcel and express services in Central and South America. Its main base is Tocumen International Airport, Panama City.

History
The airline was established in February 1996 and started operations on August 15, 1996. It began operations with charter flights, but added scheduled services on November 7, 1996.  It is owned by Felix Picardi (51%) and DHL (49%) and has 450 employees in Panama (as of May 2022).

Since April 2020, Pablo Rousselin has been the current Managing Director, replacing Steve Getzler after his retirement.

Destinations

DHL Aero Expreso operates freight services to the following scheduled international destinations (as of April 2022):

Fleet

Current fleet
The DHL Aero Expreso fleet consists of the following aircraft (as of February 2023):

Former fleet
4 Boeing 727-200F
1 further Boeing 757-200PCF

Accidents and incidents
On April 7, 2022, DHL Aero Expreso Flight 7216, a Boeing 757-200PCF (registered HP-2010DAE) from DHL Aero Expreso while operating for DHL de Guatemala, made an emergency landing after taking off from Juan Santamaría International Airport due to hydraulic issues. After the aircraft landed back, it veered off the runway and broke up into two parts after falling into a ditch. The accident caused No casualties nor injuries. The airport was shut down for several hours after the crash and the aircraft was written off.

See also
List of airlines of Panama

References

External links

Airlines of Panama
Cargo airlines
Airlines established in 1996
DHL
Companies based in Panama City